is a female Japanese light novelist and essayist.

Career 
Kazuki started writing novels when she was in her second year of junior high school. After taking an entrance exam, she entered into a national university before graduating and becoming busy with work, stopping her from writing. Once she was married and her child entered kindergarten, Kazuki had more free time, which she used to start writing again. From 2013 onwards, she started publishing her novel Ascendance of a Bookworm on the user-generated novel publishing website Shōsetsuka ni Narō which saw success. In 2015, she officially debuted with said series under the T.O. Books imprint.

From 2015 to 2017, Kazuki founded a research group and wrote for the magazine Minna no Toshokan (みんなの図書館) where she published her essays about issues surrounding libraries.

Bibliography

Novels 

 Ascendance of a Bookworm (本好きの下剋上 〜司書になるためには手段を選んでいられません〜) (Illustrated by You Shiina, published by T.O. Books, 27 volumes, 2015 -)

References

External links 

 香月美夜 - syosetu.com
 

Living people
Japanese essayists
Japanese novelists
Light novelists
Year of birth missing (living people)